Niederanven is a commune Luxembourg, located north-east of Luxembourg City, and derives its name from principal town, Niederanven. , it has a population of 6,156.

The commune of Niederanven is the intersection for the A1 motorway and N1. Luxembourg Airport is located within the boundaries of the communes Niederanven and Sandweiler.

Geography
, the town of Niederanven, which lies in the north-east of the commune, has a population of 1,472. Other towns within the commune include Ernster, Hostert, Oberanven, Rameldange, Senningen, Senningerberg, and Waldhof.

Population

Twin towns — sister cities

Niederanven is a founding member of the Douzelage, a town twinning association of towns across the European Union. This active town twinning began in 1991 and there are regular events, such as a produce market from each of the other countries and festivals. As of 2019, its members are:

 Agros, Cyprus
 Altea, Spain
 Asikkala, Finland
 Bad Kötzting, Germany
 Bellagio, Italy
 Bundoran, Ireland
 Chojna, Poland
 Granville, France
 Holstebro, Denmark
 Houffalize, Belgium
 Judenburg, Austria
 Kőszeg, Hungary
 Marsaskala, Malta
 Meerssen, Netherlands
 Oxelösund, Sweden
 Preveza, Greece
 Rokiškis, Lithuania
 Rovinj, Croatia
 Sesimbra, Portugal
 Sherborne, England, United Kingdom
 Sigulda, Latvia
 Siret, Romania
 Škofja Loka, Slovenia
 Sušice, Czech Republic
 Tryavna, Bulgaria
 Türi, Estonia
 Zvolen, Slovakia

References

External links
 

 
Communes in Luxembourg (canton)
Towns in Luxembourg